Pannaivilai is a small village covered by Palmyra trees in Tuticorin District, Tamil Nadu, India. PannaiVillai is derived from two tamil word Pannai and villai, which means land which grows or has Palmyra trees. In colloquial language its pannai villaigira thaana idam.  This village has Tucker Higher secondary school.

Geography
Pannaivilai is situated near Eral of Thoothukudi district. On the north side it is surrounded by a big pool called 'Perungulam'.

Demographics
Everybody in the village belongs the Nadar community. Christianity is the main religion followed.

The nearby cities are Tirunelveli (47 km) and Thoothukudi (45 km). The nearest railway stations are Nazareth (25 km) and Kurumbur (13 km). The nearest harbor and airport is situated at Thoothukudi (47 km).

Places of worship 
 Holy Trinity Church, Pannaivilai (CSI Thoothukudi-Nazareth Diocese, Pannaivilai)

Landmark
Pannaivilai puthur is situated on the East of Pannaivilai, on the West is Perungulam Lake, Pandaravilai, Mannarayanthattu, on the South Pannaivilai Bungalow, Perungulam village (Town Panchayat) Eral and on the North is Kombukaranpottal, Nattathi and Sawyerpuram. Pannaivilai is 23 km south of Tuticorin, (District Headquarters) Tuticorin is mainly famous for salt manufacturing, shipping etc.,

Information
Police Station Limit: Eral
Near Railway Station: Tuticorin / Kurumbur / Tirunelveli / Tiruchendur
Near Airport: Tuticorin / Madurai / Trivandrum

External links
Pannaivilai website
Image

Villages in Thoothukudi district